The MIDI Mafia is a music production duo consisting of American Bruce Waynne (born Waynne Nugent) from Brooklyn, New York and Canadian Dirty Swift (born Kevin Risto) from Ottawa, Ontario. Together as Midi Mafia since 2003, they are most notable for their production of 50 Cent's number-one single "21 Questions". The MIDI Mafia has also produced for artists such as Frank Ocean ("Swim Good"), Fantasia ("When I See U"), Sha Stimuli (the single "Clap At Ya"), Capone-N-Noreaga ("Yes Sir"), Justin Bieber, Bravehearts, Gemma Fox, Jean Grae, Talib Kweli, Young Buck, Nelly, Miri Ben-Ari, Lloyd Banks and Tamia.

History

Beginnings
Bruce Waynne met Dirty Swift at Makin' Records Studio in Brooklyn, NY, while working on a project for Bad Seed. At the time, Swift was the in house engineer/beat maker for the project, while Bruce pitched beats and helped compose and perform choruses for Bad Seed.

The duo officially began working together after attending a meeting with manager Tony Perez, who suggested that Bruce and Swift would make a good musical team. They began to hold meetings with different A&R representatives and did spec work for various people, including Sylvia Rhone, who was the president of  Elektra Records at the time.

Initial success
In 2002 Dino Devalie, who was preparing to sign 50 Cent to his label, approached The MIDI Mafia about using some of their beats for 50 Cent's debut record, Get Rich or Die Tryin'. MIDI Mafia agreed, and though 50 Cent ended up signing to Interscope Records instead, their beats were used for the song "21 Questions", which was featured on Get Rich or Die Tryin'''.

After the success of "21 Questions", The MIDI Mafia signed a publishing deal with Sony/ATV and a label and production deal with Elektra Records. They were also offered A&R positions at Elektra and were being groomed to run Black Music.

In 2006, The MIDI Mafia launched FamilyTies, an imprint label that allows them to sign and develop their own roster of talent. Singer/songwriter Deemi was the first artist signed to their label.

The MIDI Mafia introduced themselves in to the Pop/R&B world when they produced "When I See U", (song originally written for Tori Kelly when she was signed to Geffen Records) the second single from Fantasia Barrino's self-titled album Fantasia which held the number one spot for eight weeks on the U.S. Billboard's Hot R&B/Hip-Hop Songs charts. The song was written by Grammy award-winning songwriter Jane’t Sewell (which The MIDI Mafia discovered and developed), Bruce Waynne, and Erika Nuri.

In 2007, the duo worked with Jennifer Lopez on her track "Hold It Don't Drop It", contributing as both writers and producers.

Relocation to Los Angeles
In 2008, The MIDI Mafia moved from New York to Los Angeles. After their relocation, MIDI collaborated with American Idol contestant David Archuleta, contributing a track on his self-titled debut album, released in November 2008.

In the process of working with Brandy and James Fauntleroy II, MIDI Mafia met and began to work with Frank Ocean, whom at the time went by the name Lonny Breaux. Then, Frank was working as a lyricist, and approached The MIDI Mafia with a desire to become better at composing melodies.

While with The MIDI Mafia, Frank Ocean wrote the songs "Quickly" for John Legend, "Bigger" and "Mamma’s Boy" for Justin Bieber. In 2010, The MIDI Mafia recorded Frank Ocean's mix tape, Nostalgia Ultra, in which The MIDI Mafia produced the song Swim Good. The mixtape was recorded by The MIDI Mafia engineer, Reggie Rojo Jr.

The MIDI Mafia also collaborated with Frank Ocean as writers on the track "Bad Religion", off Ocean's debut album, Channel Orange".

Branding
In November 2009, "PHamous", a hip house song they wrote and produced, was used as a backing track for a flash mob at the Planet Hollywood Resort and Casino in Las Vegas. The flash mob was conceived by YouTuber ShayCarl, who was assisted by fellow YouTubers LisaNova, MysteryGuitarMan, KassemG, Denise Vlogs, Traphik aka TimothyDeLaGhetto2 and HiimRawn. The flashmob video reached two million views within in 5 days of its release.

Within the first 20 minutes of the song being posted for download on the Internet, 450,000 people downloaded the song, causing The MIDI Mafia’s website to crash.

"PHamous" was used in promos for VH1 television programs and it was also used as the ending song for the weekly video of What da Faq Show which airs on YouTube and Facebook.

On July 16, 2010, the video for "PHamous" debuted on YouTube on TheStation channel, a collaboration channel of most of the YouTubers of the original flash mob, including the lyric about being "friends with ShayCarl." The song was also featured on the We Killed the Radio Star Podcast as the introductory and concluding piece of music during the episode "Don't Drink the Water".

Vegas Lights
On June 1, 2010, The MIDI Mafia released their own album, Vegas Lights, via FamilyTies. The songs "PHamous", "Last Call" "Mr. Vegas", and "2 Piece" were included on the album. "PHamous", "Last Call", and "2 Piece" were also featured on Season 3 of the MTV show, Jersey Shore. "Mr. Vegas" was used for former Dance Moms star Kalani Hilliker's hip hop trio on Abby's Ultimate Dance Competition. "Mr. Vegas" features an Acme siren.

The song "Lucky Tonight" was featured on Jersey Shore vs American Reunion, an MTV video used to cross-promote the new season of Jersey Shore and the release of the movie, American Reunion.

Get Connected
In the beginning of 2012, The MIDI Mafia released Get Connected, an EDM album. MIDI Mafia used the project to re-launch their brand.

A remix of their song "Blinded By The Lights" off of Get Connected was used in a promotional trailer for Pauly D’s show, The Pauly D Project.

On July 27, 2012, Conor Maynard released his debut album Contrast featuring the Midi Mafia produced "Pictures".

The MIDI Mafia also remixed Josh Osho's "Giants" featuring Childish Gambino which was included on Osho's album L.I.F.E.

References

External links

American hip hop record producers
Canadian hip hop record producers
Record production teams